Sierra Highway or El Camino Sierra is a road in Southern California, United States. El Camino Sierra refers to the full length of a trail formed in the 19th century, rebuilt as highways in the early 20th century, that ran from Los Angeles to Lake Tahoe following parts of modern State Route 14, U.S. Route 395 and State Route 89. Two portions of this road are currently signed as Sierra Highway. The first is an old alignment of SR 14/U.S. Route 6 from Los Angeles to Mojave. This road is also signed with the unusual designation of State Route 14U through the city of Santa Clarita. The second part signed as Sierra Highway is a portion of US 395 in Bishop.

Traversing the extremes of California, from the Mojave Desert to the Sierra Nevada, El Camino Sierra has been advertised to the world as a highway to showcase the natural beauty of California as far back as 1910. Though most of Sierra Highway was bypassed in the early 1970s with freeways, the road is still well known. The portion through the San Gabriel Mountains is noted as the primary filming location for the film Duel.

Route description

El Camino Sierra connects Los Angeles with Lake Tahoe along the eastern edge of California, serving the counties of Los Angeles, Kern, Inyo, Mono, Alpine and El Dorado. The highway exists as a roadway now called Sierra Highway from Los Angeles to Mojave. North of Mojave, El Camino Sierra is better known by the numbered designations in current use. While traversing the state, the highway crosses several mountain passes. The highway crests the San Gabriel Mountains via Soledad Pass. While in the Sierra Nevada the highway crosses Sherwin Summit, Deadman Summit, Conway Summit, Devil's Gate Pass, Monitor Pass and Luther Pass.

Southern California
Sierra Highway begins at Tunnel Station within the northernmost limits of the City of Los Angeles, where it intersects with San Fernando Road. This junction was historically the intersection of U.S. Route 99 and U.S. Route 6. It is located adjacent to the intersection of the replacement freeways, the Newhall Pass interchange of Interstate 5 and State Route 14.

The highway serves as one of the main thoroughfares of Santa Clarita. Through the city, Route 14 was moved to a freeway alignment in 1971; however, the process to decommission the old alignment of Route 14 is not complete. As a result, this portion is signed California State Route 14U, the U signifying "un-relinquished". Formal specifications for Route 14U are not published on Caltrans logs, but the route's existence is acknowledged in Caltrans' bridge inventory logs. According to the City of Santa Clarita, Caltrans maintains Sierra Highway (14U) from 500 feet north of Newhall Avenue to Whispering Leaves Drive. The remaining part of Sierra Highway through the City of Santa Clarita is maintained by the city and not part of the 14U designation.

Sierra Highway, modern  Route 14, and a main line of the Union Pacific Railroad all cross the San Gabriel Mountains, cresting the mountains at Soledad Pass (elevation ). The three transportation arteries use different paths up the mountains, separating at Santa Clarita and converging near Acton. Sierra Highway uses Mint Canyon, the railroad uses Soledad Canyon and the modern Route 14 is a hybrid route using the ridges and side canyons between the two older routes. These canyons are formed by the Santa Clara River and its tributaries.

Upon exiting the mountains, Sierra Highway enters the Antelope Valley and serves as one of the main streets of Palmdale, Lancaster, and Rosamond. The highway runs parallel to the modern Route 14 and the railroad, becoming a frontage road. Just shy of Mojave the freeway portion of Route 14 ends, while the frontage road becomes a dirt path and eventually terminates. From this point, the canonical route of Sierra Highway joins State Route 14, passing through downtown Mojave.

U.S. Route 395 and State Route 89

North of Mojave the alignments of State Routes 14 and 89, and U.S. Route 395 have not significantly changed since first paved, and are called El Camino Sierra. Significant portions have been upgraded to a divided highway; however, most of the upgrades used the same alignment as the old two lane road. The highway cuts across Red Rock Canyon State Park to follow a series of valleys along the crest of the Sierra Nevada. As of 2009, the only other signed section of Sierra Highway is a portion of  U.S. 395 past the separation with U.S. 6 in Bishop.

U.S. 395 was rebuilt on a new alignment on the ascent to Sherwin Summit and around Crowley Lake. Unlike the highway relocation in southern California, the old alignments have been renamed, now called Lower Rock Creek Road, Old Sherwin Grade, and Crowley Creek Road; not Sierra Highway. From here to Lake Tahoe, the highway crosses mountainous terrain inside the Sierra Nevada, giving the highway its name. While in the Sierra Nevada, the road passes by attractions such as Mammoth Mountain, Yosemite National Park and Mono Lake. El Camino Sierra separates from U.S. 395, just prior to the Nevada state line at Topaz Lake, following SR 89. This is the only portion of the route not used year-round, as Caltrans closes Route 89 over Monitor Pass during winter months. Motorists destined for Lake Tahoe during the winter closures can continue along US 395 into Nevada, and return to California via Nevada State Route 88 or Nevada State Route 207.

History

El Camino Sierra

The first recorded journey along what would become El Camino Sierra was by Jedediah Smith in 1826. The trail was in common use by prospectors passing through the area because of the California Gold Rush and Comstock Lode. While still mostly a dirt road, several people began promoting El Camino Sierra as a scenic route. In 1910, the Los Angeles Times announced that Governor Gillet had announced funding to construct a new road to connect El Camino Real with Yosemite National Park. When finished, a new "wonderful circuit" route would be complete and El Camino Sierra would become "one of the most beautiful scenic routes in the world." In 1912, the Southern Pacific Railroad published an article called "Two Mules and a Motorist" in which the author's trip down El Camino Sierra was detailed, promoting the trail as a scenic side trip, via pack mules, from its rail lines. In 1915, the California Teachers Association distributed a promotional book to the annual convention of the National Education Association. This book contained an article that sung the praises of this "soon-to-be-world-famous highway" called El Camino Sierra. While noting that it was still mostly an unimproved trail, the article assured the readers that county and state officials were working frantically to upgrade the route and, with the aid of convict labor, this would soon be a "boulevard the entire distance from Los Angeles to Lake Tahoe." The article concluded by stating El Camino Sierra was "a highway with a hundred by-ways, each by-way with a hundred wonders". The article also implored the state legislature to extend El Camino Sierra to Truckee, Quincy and Susanville using a route similar to modern State Route 89, SR 70 returning to US 395.

By 1918, El Camino Sierra had been included in the Blue Book, an early road atlas of the United States. The Los Angeles Times declared El Camino Sierra complete on February 19, 1931, announcing that the portion from Mojave to Owens Valley was now paved, and would be dedicated the following Sunday.

Sierra Highway
During the 1930s, two U.S. highways, both formed in 1926, were extended into California using El Camino Sierra. The southern terminus of U.S. 395 was extended from Spokane, Washington to San Diego, using El Camino Sierra from near what is now Topaz Lake to Inyokern, by 1935. By 1937, U.S. Route 6 was extended from Colorado, mostly along the Midland Trail, to Long Beach using El Camino Sierra south of Bishop. As part of the 1964 state highway renumbering US 6 was truncated at Bishop, and the route from the separation with US 395 to I-5 was renumbered SR 14.

Though during the 1970s most of Sierra Highway was bypassed by freeways and expressways, the old two-lane road remained a famous roadway. In 1971, Steven Spielberg made his first feature-length film, Duel, along Sierra Highway, near Acton. The film is about an unseen truck driver who stalks and attempts to kill an innocent motorist trapped in the truck's game. It prominently shows the desert portions of Sierra Highway. With Duel'''s status, one of the trucks used in the film is still on the road and in the process of being restored. The current owner has driven the truck along Sierra Highway for nostalgia, enjoying the terrified looks he receives from passing motorists who recognize it. Other movies have since been filmed in the vicinity, including scenes in The Terminator''.

Major intersections

See also

References

External links

Floodgap Roadgap by Cameron Kaiser
Camino Sierra by Lloyd L. Chambers; hosted by Ray Delea

Named highways in California
Roads in Alpine County, California
Roads in El Dorado County, California
Roads in Inyo County, California
Roads in Kern County, California
Roads in Los Angeles County, California
Roads in Mono County, California
Transportation in Palmdale, California
Bishop, California
Lancaster, California
Mojave, California
Owens Valley
Rosamond, California
Santa Clarita, California
South Lake Tahoe, California
U.S. Route 6
U.S. Route 395